Ali Hussain (born 30 March 1979) is a Pakistani cricketer. He played in 38 first-class and 12 List A matches between 1998 and 2009.

References

External links
 

1979 births
Living people
Pakistani cricketers
Lahore cricketers
Sui Southern Gas Company cricketers
Cricketers from Lahore